Will O'Neill (born April 28, 1988) is an American former professional ice hockey defenseman who most recently played with EC Red Bull Salzburg in the Austrian Hockey League (EBEL). O'Neill was selected by the Atlanta Thrashers in the 7th round (210th overall) of the 2006 NHL Entry Draft.

Playing career
As a junior, O'Neill played with the Omaha Lancers of the United States Hockey League (USHL) where he helped his team to win the Clark Cup as the 2007–08 USHL Champions. He then attended University of Maine where he played four seasons of NCAA Division I ice hockey with the Maine Black Bears, where he was recognized for his outstanding performance during his senior, 2011–12, year, when he was named the New England Division I All-Star team by the New England Hockey Writers.

On March 26, 2012, the Winnipeg Jets of the National Hockey League (NHL) signed O'Neill to a three-year, entry-level contract.  On July 2, 2015, O'Neill left the Jets as a free agent and signed a one-year, two-way contract with the Pittsburgh Penguins.

On July 1, 2016, O'Neill signed a two-year, two-way contract as a free agent with the Philadelphia Flyers. In the 2016–17 season, O'Neill spent the entirety of the year with AHL affiliate, the Lehigh Valley Phantoms, recording 28 assists and 31 points in 57 games.

During his second year under contract with the Flyers in the 2017–18 season, O'Neill was recalled from the Phantoms and belatedly made his NHL debut against the St. Louis Blues at the Scottrade Center on November 2, 2017. He was returned to Lehigh following the game, finishing the season in the AHL with 19 points in 59 games.

As a free agent from the Flyers, O'Neill opted to return on a one-year AHL contract to former club, the Wilkes-Barre/Scranton Penguins on July 9, 2018. In the following 2018–19 season, O'Neill was unable to recapture his previous success in Wilkes/Barre/Scranton, limited to 8 assists in 28 games from the blueline before opting to be released from his contract with the club on January 25, 2019.

O'Neill decided to continue his career abroad, promptly agreeing to his first European contract in signing for the remainder of the season with Austrian club, EC Red Bull Salzburg of the EBEL, on January 29, 2019.

Career statistics

Awards and honors

See also 

 List of players who played only one game in the NHL

References

External links

1988 births
American men's ice hockey defensemen
Atlanta Thrashers draft picks
Ice hockey players from Massachusetts
Lehigh Valley Phantoms players
Living people
Maine Black Bears men's ice hockey players
Omaha Lancers players
Philadelphia Flyers players
EC Red Bull Salzburg players
Sportspeople from Salem, Massachusetts
St. John's IceCaps players
Wilkes-Barre/Scranton Penguins players